Peter Arne Jöback (born 4 June 1971 in Stockholm, Sweden) is a Swedish singer, actor and musical artist.

Biography

Early life and education 
Peter Jöback was born on 4 June 1971 in Stockholm. He spent his childhood in Värmland and Östergötland.

As a student Jöback attended the Adolf Fredrik's Music School in Stockholm.

1995–2000 
Peter Jöback got his big break through his collaboration with ABBA's Björn Ulvaeus and Benny Andersson. In their musical Kristina från Duvemåla (The Emigrants) at Malmö Opera and Music Theatre, Jöback created the role of Robert, whose theme song ("Guldet blev till sand") broke every record in the Swedish charts. The musical was seen by over one million Swedes, and the original cast CD-box became a triple-platinum album and received several Swedish Grammy awards. Jöback received his first Golden Mask for his role as Robert.

In 1997, Jöback released the album "Personliga Val", which reached number two on the Swedish album chart. It featured 11 pop-oriented interpretations of songs from famous musicals.

Cameron Mackintosh discovered Jöback's talent and offered him the lead as Chris in Miss Saigon at the Theatre Royal, Drury Lane, in London's West End, in 1997. Three years later, at the same theatre, Jöback created the role of Michael in Macintosh's original production of The Witches of Eastwick.

2000–2005 
In September 2000 Peter Jöback released Only When I Breathe which was his first studio album in English. The album reached number one on the Swedish album charts.

His many stage performances and albums have been met with critical acclaim. Jöback's Christmas album was released in 2002. On this album Jöback teamed up with Norwegian singer Sissel Kyrkjebø in a duet of the Irish folk song "Be thou my vision" in a Swedish translation titled "Gå Inte Förbi". The duo have since been frequent guests at each other's concerts.

In 2004 Jöback collaborated with Gothenburg Symphony Orchestra conducted by Nick Davies in a project called Storybook where he performed classic songs in brand new arrangements. GSO and Jöback released a CD which became a Gold Disc and also performed two concerts in the Globe Arena and Scandinavium Arena in Sweden. The album also brought Jöback to a superstar status in Norway. His first solo tour there in 2005 was a success both with audience and media.

2006–2009
During 2006–2007 Peter Jöback starred as the MC in a production of Cabaret in Stockholm and Gothenburg. He received critical praise as well as his second Golden Mask Tony Award. He already in 2003 performed as the MC at Gladsaxe Theatre in Copenhagen.

Jöback ended 2008 with a sold-out Christmas tour in arenas in Scandinavia following the release of a new 4× platinum-selling Christmas album. In 2007 he also toured Scandinavia with his platinum-selling studio album with original songs co-written by himself. In January 2009 Jöback moved to New York City to get new inspiration and make new acquaintances. This has resulted in an album entitled East Side Stories, recorded in Woodstock, featuring prominent guests such as Kate Pierson from The B52's, Sia Furler, Gail Ann Dorsey and the group Betty.

2010–present 
Peter Jöback entered Melodifestivalen 2010, the Swedish Pre-selection for the Eurovision Song Contest 2010. He received a wildcard from SVT. His song, "Hollow", reached the final of the competition, ultimately finishing in 9th position. In 2011, Jöback performed in the finale of The Phantom of the Opera at the Royal Albert Hall. In 2012, Jöback starred as the Phantom in the London production of The Phantom of the Opera. He repeated the role on Broadway in April 2013.  His last performance as Phantom on Broadway was on 24 August 2013, when Hugh Panaro took over the role again. However, he has since returned to bring the Phantom to his homeland. The show premiered in September 2016 in Stockholm. In January 2018, Jöback took over the role of the Phantom on Broadway for the 30th Anniversary, alongside Ali Ewoldt.

Personal life
Peter Jöback is the son of the singer Monica Lind.

On 25 June 2010, Jöback married his partner, Oskar Nilsson at the Cirkus Theatre in Stockholm.

Discography

Albums
 1993: Peter Jöback
 1997: Personliga val
 2000: Only When I Breathe
 2002: I Feel Good and I'm Worth It
 2002: Jag kommer hem igen till jul
 2003: Jag kommer hem igen till jul (new version with extra song)
 2004: Det här är platsen
 2004: Storybook
 2006: Flera sidor av samma man (double CD compilation)
 2007: Människor som du och jag
 2008: Himlen är inget tak (A live CD with Eva Dahlgren)
 2009: East Side Stories
 2010: En kväll med Petros (Live Album)
 2011: Livet, kärleken och döden – La vie, l'amour, la mort
 2012: Jag kommer hem igen till jul – Jubileumsutgåva	
 2013: I Love Musicals – The Album

Singles
 1990: "En sensation"
 1990: "Let's Kiss (Like Angels Do)"
 1991: "This Time"
 1992: "More Than a Game" (with Towe Jaarnek)
 1993: "Det ingen annan vet"
 1993: "Du är min längtan"
 1993: "Nu när jag funnit dig"
 1996: "Guldet blev till sand"
 1997: "En sång om oss"
 1998: "Vem ser ett barn"
 1999: "Hon ser inte mig"
 2000: "Higher"
 2000: "Tonight"
 2001: "Under My Skin"
 2002: "She's Like A Butterfly"
 2002: "Sinner"
 2003: "Gå inte förbi", duet with Sissel Kyrkjebø
 2004: "Du har förlorat mer än jag"
 2004: "Sommarens sista sång"
 2006: "Jag blundar i solens sken"
 2007: "Stockholm i natt"
 2007: "Han är med mig nu", featuring Annika Norlin [Säkert]
 2007: "Italy vs Helsinki", together with the band Laakso
 2007: "Jag står för allt jag gjort"
 2008: "Himlen är inget tak", with Eva Dahlgren
 2009: "Sing", with Kate Pierson
 2010: "Hollow"
 2011: "Jag kommer hem igen till jul"
 2022: "The River"

Cast recordings/soundtracks
 1992: Rockmusikalen Grease
 1993: Aladdin
 1993: Fame – The Musical
 1994: Aladdin Jafars Återkomst
 1996: Kristina från Duvemåla
 1999: 16 Favoriter ur Kristina från Duvemåla
 2000: The Witches Of Eastwick
 2007: Cabaret

Musicals and other shows 
1982–83: Mio Min Mio
1982–84: Sound Of Music
1983–84: Snövit (Snow white)
1984–85: Kavallerijungfrun
1988: Här & Nu
1990: Melodifestivalen
1990: West Side Story
1991–92: Grease
1993: Aladdin
1993–94: Fame
1994: Djungelboken
1994–95: Musical Express 1 & 2
1995–98: Kristina Från Duvemåla
1997: Miss Saigon, in London
1997: Peter Jöback – A Musical Voyage1998: Jesus Christ Superstar1998: Personliga Val – Live1998: Peter Jöback Show1999: Där Regnbågen Slutar2000: Stuart Little2000: The Witches of Eastwick, in London2003: Cabaret, in Copenhagen2005: Concert tour in Norway2005: Rhapsody in rock, Sweden tour2006: Cabaret, in Stockholm2007: Cabaret, in Gothenburg2008: En julkonsert2009: En julkonsert2012: The Phantom of the Opera, Her Majesty's Theatre, London
2013: The Phantom of the Opera, The Majestic Theatre, New York City
2018: The Phantom of the Opera'', The Majestic Theatre, New York City

References

External links
Peter Jöback's official site (English and Swedish)
Official myspace (English)
Unofficial site (English)
Label official site (Swedish)
Management official site (Swedish)

1971 births
Living people
20th-century Swedish male singers
20th-century Swedish male actors
Swedish male musical theatre actors
Swedish male voice actors
21st-century Swedish male singers
21st-century Swedish male actors
Singers from Stockholm
Male actors from Stockholm
Swedish LGBT singers
English-language singers from Sweden
Swedish-language singers
Melodifestivalen contestants of 2010
Melodifestivalen contestants of 1990